Govind Chandra Dev (Zilla) High School, better known as G.C.D. High School or G.C.D. (Zilla) High School, Rayagada, is one of the oldest high schools of the Rayagada district in the Indian state of Odisha. The school is named after Govind Chandra Dev Thataraja Bahadur. It is one among the 17 recognized high schools of the Rayagada district.

History
The school was established in 1938. During pre-independence period, the district board at Koraput (with the collector and agent as its president) upgraded the higher elementary school at Rayagada to a middle school in 1938.

The school was a pioneer in the education field in the undivided Koraput district. It is an Oriya medium school affiliated to the Board of Secondary Education, Odisha under the State Government of Odisha. The school maintains an Eco-Club.

The school has given rise to many important personalities including:
 Dr. Sashi Bhusana Padhi, former Collector and District Magistrate, Rayagada
 Hon'ble Shri Justice R. K. Patro, former Judge of the Orissa High Court
 Hon'ble Shri Justice U. Durga Prasada Rao, Judge of the Telangana and Andhra Pradesh High Court

See also

Board of Secondary Education, Odisha
List of schools in Odisha

References

1938 establishments in India
Education in Rayagada district
Educational institutions established in 1938
High schools and secondary schools in Odisha